LiAZ is a bus manufacturing company located in Likino-Dulyovo, Russia. It is now a wholly owned subsidiary of GAZ. Specializes in designing and manufacturing buses large and extra large class (length 10.5 m and +).

Starting in 2015, the GAZ Group has introduced a single brand for all its bus manufacturing subsidiaries, and newly manufactured vehicles now feature the deer badge of the GAZ company.

History 
The factory was created in 1937 as a wood processing plant LOZOD (Likino Engineered Wood Test Factory). It produced pressed wood products, as well as wood particle boards. In 1944 the factory was renamed to LiMZ (Likino Machinery Factory) and it started producing small machinery like power saws and portable generators.

In 1959 the factory started to assemble ZIL-158 passenger buses. It was renamed LiAZ the same year. In 1967 the factory designed and began manufacturing the first bus model of its own named LiAZ-677. The factory produced 194,183 buses of this model in the next 29 years.

In 1986 began the production of the new model LiAZ-5256, which today is the most common large bus model  in Russia (through December 2013 more than 24,650 buses had been manufactured).

After the collapse of the Soviet Union, LiAZ started to experience difficulties. In 1996 bus manufacturing ceased and the factory declared bankruptcy in 1997. The factory has since been restructured and is now known as Likinskij Avtobusnyj Zavod LLC. In 2000 it was acquired by the RusAvtoProm Corporation, and has been part of the GAZ Group since 2005.

LiAZ also manufactured trolleybuses between 2005 and 2012.

Models

Buses

Historical 
 ZIL-158/LiAZ-158 (1959–1970), front-engined bus
 LiAZ-677 (1967–1996), front-engined bus with automatic transmission

Current model range 
 LiAZ-4292 (since 2015), low-floor city bus of middle class
 LiAZ-5250 (since 2011)
 LiAZ-5251 (since 2014)
 LiAZ-5256 (since 1986), rear-engined bus
 LiAZ-5292 (since 2004), rear-engined low-floor bus. Buses of this model were used for the Olympic games 2014 in Sochi.
 LiAZ-5293 (since 2006), rear-engined low-entry bus
 LiAZ-6212 (since 2002), articulated bus based on LiAZ-5256
 LiAZ-6213 (since 2007), low-floor articulated bus based on LiAZ-5292
 LiAZ-6274 (since 2018), low-floor electric bus

Trolleybuses 
 LiAZ-5280 (2005–2012), trolleybus based on LiAZ-5256
 LiAZ-52802, low-floor trolleybus based on LiAZ-5292
 LiAZ-52803, low-entry trolleybus based on LiAZ-5293

See also 
 GoLAZ
 GAZ Group
 Russian Buses

References

External links 

 Likino Bus Plant (LiAZ) History
 GAZ Group Official Homepage

Bus manufacturers of the Soviet Union
1937 establishments in Russia
Bus manufacturers of Russia
Trolleybus manufacturers
GAZ Group
Russian brands
Vehicle manufacturing companies established in 1937
Companies based in Moscow Oblast
Electric vehicle manufacturers of Russia
Contract vehicle manufacturers